|}

The Limerick E.B.F. Mares Novice Hurdle is a Grade 3 National Hunt novice hurdle race in Ireland which is open to mares aged four years or older. 
It is run at Limerick over a distance of 2 miles (3,218 metres), and it is scheduled to take place each year in March.

The race was first run in 2004 and was awarded Grade 3 status in 2013.

Records
Most successful jockey (3 wins):
 Davy Russell -  Blazing Liss (2005), Oligarch Society (2009), Lackaneen Leader (2018)  

Most successful trainer (4 wins): 
 Willie Mullins–  Morning Supreme (2010), Kate Appleby Shoes (2017), Robin De Carlow (2019), Eabha Grace (2023)

Winners

See also
 List of Irish National Hunt races

References
Racing Post

National Hunt races in Ireland
National Hunt hurdle races
Recurring sporting events established in 2004
Limerick Racecourse